Ceragenia aurulenta is a species of beetle in the family Cerambycidae. It was described by Monné & Martins in 1991.

References

Trachyderini
Beetles described in 1991